Larisa Savchenko and Natasha Zvereva were the defending champions, but Savchenko did not compete this year.

Zvereva teamed up with Gigi Fernández and lost in the final to Lori McNeil and Rennae Stubbs. The score was 3–6, 7–5, 7–5.

Seeds
The first four seeds received a bye to the second round.

Draw

Finals

Top half

Bottom half

References

External links
 Official results archive (ITF)
 Official results archive (WTA)

1992 WTA Tour
1992 in Canadian tennis